Lozove is an urban-type settlement in Khmelnytskyi Raion (district) of Khmelnytskyi Oblast in western Ukraine. It belongs to Derazhnia urban hromada, one of the hromadas of Ukraine. The settlement's population was 1,650 as of the 2001 Ukrainian Census and 

The settlement was first founded in 1929 as Torforozrobka. It received the status of an urban-type settlement in 1949.

Until 18 July 2020, Lozove belonged to Derazhnia Raion. The raion was abolished in July 2020 as part of the administrative reform of Ukraine, which reduced the number of raions of Khmelnytskyi Oblast to three. The area of Derazhnia Raion was merged into Khmelnytskyi Raion.

See also
 Vovkovyntsi, the other urban-type settlement in Derazhnia Raion of Khmelnytskyi Oblast

References

Urban-type settlements in Khmelnytskyi Raion
Populated places established in 1929